The 2022 Cambridge City Council election took place on 5 May 2022 to elect members of Cambridge City Council. This is on the same day as other local elections.

Result summary

Ward results

Abbey

Arbury

Castle

Cherry Hinton

Coleridge

East Chesterton

King's Hedges

Market

Newnham

Petersfield

Queen Edith’s

Romsey

Trumpington

West Chesterton

By-elections

Trumpington

References 

2020s in Cambridge
Cambridge
2022